Mr. and Mrs. is a 2012 Nigerian romantic drama film written and produced by Chinwe Egwuagu and directed by Ikechukwu Onyeka, starring Nse Ikpe Etim, Joseph Benjamin, Barbara Soky, Thelma Okoduwa and Paul Apel.

Cast
Nse Ikpe Etim as Susan Abbah
Joseph Benjamin as Kenneth Abbah
Barbara Soky as Mrs Abbah
Thelma Okoduwa-Ojiji as Linda
Paul Apel as Charles
Chioma Nwosu as Mrs Brown
Mpie Mapetla as Monica
Nonye Ike as Kate
Beauty Benson as Maggie
Paul Sambo as Mr Brown
Babajide Bolarinwa as Mr Abbah

Home media
The film was released on DVD on 20 August 2012. According to Chinwe, the performance of Mr. and Mrs. was commendable at the theatres and she's been receiving a lot of requests concerning the DVD release, so she thought the time was right for a DVD release. The film was first released in Ghana a week before the official DVD release and it was well received, with commendable sales in Gold coast the same week.

References

External links
 

2012 films
English-language Nigerian films
Nigerian romantic drama films
2012 romantic drama films
Films shot in Abuja
Films set in Abuja
2010s English-language films